A Strategic Development Planning Authority is a partnership established under the Planning etc (Scotland) Act 2006 to prepare and keep under review a strategic development plan for its area. There are currently four Strategic Development Planning Authorities (SDPAs) in Scotland, covering the four largest city regions - Aberdeen, Dundee, Edinburgh and Glasgow.

Each SDPA is made up of between two and eight planning authorities, although the area covered by its Strategic Development Plan does not always cover this full area.

Each SDPA is required to publish a Development Plan Scheme on an annual basis which sets out its timetable for the preparation of its Strategic Development Plan and identify how and when it will consult and engage with the community and interested parties. Detail regarding the preparation of Development Plan Schemes and Strategic Development Plans are contained in Regulations and a Circular.

The preparation of the first round of strategic development plans in the four city-regions is now well advanced, with proposed plans prepared for three of the four areas and a main issues report in the other (as at October 2011).

References

External links 
 Aberdeen City and Shire SDPA
 Dundee, Perth, Angus and North Fife SDPA
 Edinburgh and South East Scotland SDPA
 Glasgow and the Clyde Valley SDPA
 Strategic Development Plans in Scotland - the way forward
 Planning etc (Scotland) Act 2006
 Circular 2/08: Statutory Guidance on Strategic Development Planning Authorities
 Circular 3/08: Strategic Development Plan Areas
 Circular 1/09: Development Planning

Town and country planning in Scotland